The 1992 Canadian Soccer League season was the sixth and final season of play for the Canadian Soccer League, a Division 1 men's soccer league in the Canadian soccer pyramid.

Format and changes from previous season
Shortly before the 1992 season, the Hamilton Steelers, Nova Scotia Clippers, and Kitchener Kickers folded. The league was not doing well financially either and Montreal Supra owner Frank Aliaga was named the new league president, replacing the interim president Mario DiBartolomeo, who was the owner of the now-folded Hamilton Steelers. Hamilton folded despite offers of cost sharing with the Vancouver and Montreal team owners.

The London Lasers returned from a one-year hiatus, leaving the league with a six-team division. The league had a balanced schedule with each team playing the others a total of four times, twice each home and away. Due to the drop in teams, only four teams qualified for the playoffs. For the first time, the Championship final would not be a one-off match, but instead would be a two-tie fixture as the other rounds.

Two teams (Montreal and Vancouver) participated in the Professional Cup alongside the five APSL clubs and one from the NPSL. Neither CSL side was able to advance out of the first round.

As 1991 CSL champions, Vancouver qualified for the 1992 CONCACAF Champions' Cup, however, they withdrew from the tournament before their first match.

Summary 
Vancouver once again won the regular season title and advanced to the MITA Cup finals for the fifth consecutive year, where they met the Winnipeg Fury in the final. Winnipeg won the title becoming only the third club to win the championship, ending Vancouver's four-year winning streak, snapping Vancouver's 15 match playoff winning streak, handing them their first playoff loss since 1987.

Regular season

Playoffs
The playoffs were conducted with a total points system. Teams earned two points for a win, one point for a draw, and zero points for a loss. The team with the most points following the two-game series advanced. If the teams were tied on points, they played a 30-minute mini-game for a bonus point, followed by a penalty shootout if the mini-game remained tied.

Semifinal 

Vancouver won the series 3–1 on points.

Winnipeg won the series 3–1 on points.

Final 
 
 
Winnipeg won the series 3–1 on points.

Statistics

Top scorers

Top goaltenders

Honours
The following awards and nominations were awarded for the 1992 season.

Awards

League All-Stars

Reserves

Front office

Average home attendances

See also
 2019 Canadian Premier League season – next season of D1 soccer in Canada

References

External links
 Canadian Soccer League 1991 Media Guide and Statistics
 1992 CSL Stats

Canadian Soccer League
Canadian Soccer League (1987–1992) seasons